= Kala Kalay =

- Union Council
- کالا کلے
- Country: Pakistan
- Province: Khyber Pakhtunkhwa
- District: Swat

Population (2017)
  - Total: 24,995
- Time zone: UTC+5 (PST)

Kala Kalay (Urdu: کالا کلے) is an administrative unit, known as Union council, of Swat District in the Khyber Pakhtunkhwa province of Pakistan. District Swat has 7 Tehsils i.e. Khwazakhela, Kabal, Bahrain, Barikot, Babuzai, Charbagh, and Matta. Each Tehsill comprises certain numbers of union councils. There are 65 union councils in district Swat, 56 rural and 09 urban.

The union council consists of different villages (village councils), including village council Kalakalay, Galoch, Thaghma, Mahak and khatkoto. Pashtu is the main language in the territory, while Kohistani Gojri is spoken in some hilly areas. A riverine is separating Kalakalay from Galoch village. The Kalay and Galoch is connected with the help of a small bridge.

== See also ==
- Swat District
